Elisabeth Schellekens is a Swedish philosopher and Chair Professor of Aesthetics at Uppsala University (since 2014). Previously, she was Senior Lecturer at Durham University (2006-2014). Schellekens is known for her works in aesthetics.
Her research interests include aesthetic cognitivism and objectivism, aesthetic normativity, Hume, Kant, aesthetic and moral properties, conceptual art, non-perceptual or intelligible aesthetic value, the relations between perception and knowledge, the aesthetics and ethics of cultural heritage (esp. in armed conflict), and the interaction between aesthetic, moral, cognitive and historical value in art.

Schellekens was co-editor of the British Journal of Aesthetics between 2007 and 2019. She continues to serve on the journal's editorial board, and has served on a number of journal editorial boards, including the Journal of Aesthetics and Art Criticism and Estetika.

Current positions
 Chair Professor of Aesthetics, Department of Philosophy, Uppsala University
 Fellow, Royal Society of Arts and Sciences, Uppsala
 Fellow, Royal Society of Humanities, Uppsala University

Published works

Authored books 
Aesthetics and Morality (Continuum Books, 2007; 2nd edition, Bloomsbury Academic, 2023)
Who's Afraid of Conceptual Art, with Peter Goldie (Routledge, 2009)

Edited collections
Aesthetics: Philosophy and Martin Creed, with David del Sasso (Bloomsbury, 2022)
The Aesthetic Mind, with Peter Goldie (Oxford University Press, 2011)

Philosophy and Conceptual Art, with Peter Goldie (Oxford University Press, 2007)

References

External links
 Elisabeth Schellekens at Uppsala University

Academics of Durham University
Living people
Philosophers of art
Alumni of the University of Edinburgh
Alumni of King's College London
Academic staff of Uppsala University
Swedish women academics
Swedish philosophers
Swedish women philosophers
Kant scholars
Hume scholars
Year of birth missing (living people)